Industry Technology Facilitator (ITF) is an oil industry trade organisation established in 1999. It is owned by 30 major global oil majors and oilfield service companies. 

The group has offices in Aberdeen, UK, Houston, USA, Abu Dhabi, UAE, Perth, Australia and Kuala Lumpur, Malaysia.

Members 

ITF currently has a membership of 30 global operators and service companies including:
 Aramco Services Company
 BG Group
 BP
 Chevron
 ConocoPhillips
 DONG Energy
 ENI
 EnQuest
 ExxonMobil
 GE Oil and Gas
 Kuwait Oil Company
 Maersk
 Marathon Oil Corporation
 Nexen
 Petrofac
 Petronas
 Petroleum Development Oman
 Premier Oil
 PTTEP
 QatarEnergy
 Schlumberger
 Shell
 Siemens
 Statoil
 Technip
 Total
 Tullow Oil
 Weatherford
 Wintershall
 Wood Group
 Woodside Energy

Awards and recognition

 Alick Buchanan Smith Spirit of Enterprise: 2009 Winner – ITF
 Investors in People - Gold
 Scottish Offshore Achievement Awards: 2009 Rising Star Winner - Ryan McPherson
 IoD Scotland - Emerging Director Finalist: Neil Poxon
The topics addressed by these ITF sponsored technologies include seismic resolution, complex reservoirs, cost-effective drilling and intervention, subsea, maximising production, integrity management, and environmental performance.

References

External links
 ITF official website
 ITF Single Strategy
 Offshore Industry
 Energy KTN

Petroleum organizations
Organizations established in 1999
Energy business associations
Organisations based in Scotland
1999 establishments in Scotland